Slaviša Radović (born 8 October 1993) is a Bosnian professional footballer who plays a left-back for Bosnian Premier League club Sarajevo.

Club career
Born in Zvornik, Bosnia and Herzegovina, Radović started his career playing in Serbian clubs Jedinstvo Mali Zvornik and Lokomotiva Beograd, before joining hometown club Drina Zvornik where he played in the Bosnian Premier League, becoming a standard defensive player.

During the winter break of the 2014–15 season, Radović returned to Serbia, this time by joining top-flight side Vojvodina. He made his debut in the 2014–15 Serbian SuperLiga on 29 April 2015, in a game against Voždovac. On 12 January 2016, Vojvodina and Radović mutually terminated the contract.

On 20 January 2016, he signed a one-and-a-half-year deal with Olimpik. After Olimpik, he again went back to Serbia and played for Voždovac and Zemun, before signing with Radnik Bijeljina on 29 May 2017. Radović left Radnik in June 2020 after his contract with the club expired, winning three Republika Srpska Cups during his time at the club.

On 5 August 2020, he signed a two-year contract with Velež Mostar. Radović made his official debut for Velež in a league match win against Krupa on 15 August 2020.

On 1 July 2022, he signed for Latvian club Liepāja. After half a season, he left the club.

On 16 January 2023, he returned to Bosnia and signed for Sarajevo.

International career
Radović was part of the Republika Srpska official football team from 2013 to 2014 and after that a member of the Republika Srpska official under-23 team from 2014 to 2015.

Honours
Drina Zvornik 
First League of RS: 2013–14

Radnik Bijeljina
Republika Srpska Cup: 2016–17, 2017–18, 2018–19

Velež Mostar
Bosnian Cup: 2021–22

Notes

References

External links
Slaviša Radović stats at footballdatabase.eu

1993 births
Living people
People from Zvornik
Serbs of Bosnia and Herzegovina
Association football fullbacks
Bosnia and Herzegovina footballers
FK Drina Zvornik players
FK Vojvodina players
FK Olimpik players
FK Voždovac players
FK Zemun players
FK Radnik Bijeljina players
FK Velež Mostar players
FK Liepāja players
FK Sarajevo players
Premier League of Bosnia and Herzegovina players
Serbian SuperLiga players
Latvian Higher League players
Bosnia and Herzegovina expatriate footballers
Expatriate footballers in Serbia
Expatriate footballers in Latvia
Bosnia and Herzegovina expatriate sportspeople in Serbia